The 1977 Furman Paladins football team was an American football team that represented Furman University as a member of the Southern Conference (SoCon) during the 1977 NCAA Division I football season. In their fifth season under head coach Art Baker, Furman compiled a 4–5–2 record, with a mark of 3–2–1 in conference play, placing third in the SoCon.

Schedule

References

Furman
Furman Paladins football seasons
Furman Paladins football